Mahipala (or Mahipala I) was a notable king of the Pala dynasty, which ruled over much of the eastern regions of the Indian subcontinent between the 8th and 12th centuries. He was the son and successor of Vigrahapala II. Mahipala's reign marked a resurgence in fortunes for the Pala empire, whose boundaries were expanded as far as Varanasi. However, his rule was temporarily hampered by the northern expedition of the Chola Emperor, Rajendra I.

Mahipala was succeeded by his son, Nayapala.

See also
Pal family
Zamindars of Mahipur
 Narayangarh Raj

References

Pala kings